San Giovanni in Marignano ( or ) is a comune (municipality) in the Province of Rimini in the Italian region Emilia-Romagna, located about  southeast of Bologna and about  southeast of Rimini.

San Giovanni in Marignano borders the following municipalities: Cattolica, Gradara, Misano Adriatico, Morciano di Romagna, Saludecio, San Clemente, Tavullia.

Cattolica Airfield is an abandoned World War II US Air Force airfield in its vicinity.

References

External links
 www.marignanoweb.it/
 San Giovanni in Marignano on The campanile Project

Cities and towns in Emilia-Romagna